Rebekka (minor planet designation: 572 Rebekka) is a minor planet orbiting the Sun, which was discovered on September 19, 1905, by a German astronomer Paul Götz in Heidelberg. It was named after a young lady from Heidelberg, and may have been inspired by the asteroid's provisional designation 1905 RB.

Observations performed at the Palmer Divide Observatory in Colorado Springs, Colorado during 2007 produced a light curve with a period of 5.656 ± 0.002 hours with a brightness range of 0.40 ± 0.02 in magnitude. This agrees with the 5.65 hour period measured in 1998.

References

External links 
 Lightcurve plot of 572 Rebekka, Palmer Divide Observatory, B. D. Warner (2007)
 Asteroid Lightcurve Database (LCDB), query form (info )
 Dictionary of Minor Planet Names, Google books
 Asteroids and comets rotation curves, CdR – Observatoire de Genève, Raoul Behrend
 Discovery Circumstances: Numbered Minor Planets (1)-(5000) – Minor Planet Center
 
 

Background asteroids
Rebekka
Rebekka
XDC-type asteroids (Tholen)
C-type asteroids (SMASS)
19050919